Elizabeth L. Silver is an American novelist, essayist, memoirist, and attorney.

Personal life 
Silver was born in New Orleans. She was raised in New Orleans and Dallas. In 2001 she graduated from the University of Pennsylvania. She received an MA in creative writing from the University of East Anglia in England in 2004. Additionally, she taught English as a second language in Costa Rica.  She received a J.D. degree from the Temple University Beasley School of Law in 2008. Silver lives in Los Angeles with her family.

Career 
Silver is the author of the  novel The Execution of Noa P. Singleton, and she is working on a screen adaptation for  ImageMovers Production Company.

Silver's writing has appeared in McSweeney’s Internet Tendency, The Huffington Post, The Rumpus, The Los Angeles Review, The Millions, and The Dallas Morning News. She has also been a writer-in-residence at several artist colonies in the United States, France, and Spain.

Silver co-runs the West Coast wing of the Pen Parentis Literary Salons, has served as a PEN in the Community Writing Instructor, and teaches creative writing privately.

Silver's memoir, entitled The Tincture of Time: A Memoir of (Medical) Uncertainty, was published in April 2017 by Penguin Press.

Works

Books 
 The Execution of Noa P. Singleton (2013)
 The Tincture of Time: A Memoir of (Medical) Uncertainty (2017)

Short fiction 
 " LSAT Logic Game for Writers" (2014)

References 

1978 births
Living people
University of Pennsylvania alumni
Alumni of the University of East Anglia
Temple University Beasley School of Law alumni